Nti is a surname. Notable people with the surname include:

 Collins Agyarko Nti (born 1958), Ghanaian politician
 Opoku Nti (born 1961), Ghanaian footballer
 Theophidack Nti (born 1977), Ghanaian footballer

Surnames of African origin